Gene Carr (January 7, 1881 – December 9, 1959) was an American cartoonist.

He was one of the most active early New York City artists in the young field of comic strips. He was doing newspaper cartoons by age 15 and two years later was working for the William Randolph Hearst papers. Carr is considered a pioneer of the use of sequential panels. He did cartoons for the New York Herald, New York World and the New York Evening Journal.

His comic strip Lady Bountiful, debuted in Heart's newspapers in 1902 as a Sunday-comics filler, and the following year jumped to publisher Joseph Pulitzer's The New York World, appearing as the cover feature of May 3, 1903. The strip's star, notes comics scholar Don Markstein "has been cited by many comics historians and commentators as the very first" female protagonist of a comic strip, cautioning, "Maybe she is. It's certainly difficult to think of any that were in print before her 1902 debut."

Bibliography

== Comic strips and panels<ref nameCarr>Carr entry, '"Who's Who of American Comic Books, 1928–1999. Accessed Nov. 16, 2018.</ref> ===
 for the Hearst Syndicate 
 Lady Bountiful (launched in 1902; moved to New York World in 1903)

 for The New York World 
 Bill and the Jones Boys (1905) — Sunday strip
 Buddy's Baby Sister (1913) — Sunday strip
 Dearie  (1910) — Sunday strip
 Duddy's Baby Sister (1913) — Sunday strip 
 Everyday Movies (1921–1924;  strip taken over by Denys Wortman) — gag panel
 Home Sweet Home (1907–1908) — Sunday strip 
 Kitty Kildare (1921)
 Lady Bountiful (1903–1905, 1915–1918)
 Little Darling (1920–1921)
 Major Stuff (1914–1915) — Sunday strip 
 Mr. Al Most (1911-1912) — Sunday strip
 Pansy's Pal (1920)
 Phyllis (1903-1906) — Sunday strip
 Poor Mr. W (1917–1920)
 The Prodigal Son (1906–1907) — Sunday strip 
 Reddy and Caruso (1907) — Sunday strip 
 Romeo (1905-1907) — Sunday strip 
 Step-Brothers'' (1907-1914) — Sunday strip

Books
Carr's cartoons also appeared in reprint books and on postcards.

References

External links
 Gene Carr's St. Patrick's Day postcards

1881 births
1959 deaths
American comic strip cartoonists
Postcard artists